SERPS may refer to:

 State Earnings-Related Pension Scheme, a UK Government pension arrangement from April 6, 1978 to April 5, 2002
 SERPs, short for search engine results pages